ECW may refer to:

Professional wrestling
 Extreme Championship Wrestling (originally Eastern Championship Wrestling), a professional wrestling promotion that operated from 1992 to 2001
 The Alliance (professional wrestling) (originally the WCW/ECW Alliance), a 2001 World Wrestling Federation stable that included Extreme Championship Wrestling
 ECW (WWE brand), a World Wrestling Entertainment brand from 2006 to 2010 based on the Extreme Championship Wrestling promotion

Wrestling television programs
 ECW Hardcore TV, produced by the Extreme Championship Wrestling promotion from 1993 until 2000
 ECW on TNN, produced by the Extreme Championship Wrestling promotion from 1999 to 2000
 WWE ECW, produced by World Wrestling Entertainment from 2006 to 2010 based on the Extreme Championship Wrestling promotion

Military
 Electronic counter-warfare, a set of military measures to counteract enemy radars, missile-guidance, etc.
 English Civil War(s), a series of armed conflicts and political machinations which occurred in England from 1642 to 1651

Other
 Eastern Coach Works, a defunct bus body building company from England
 ECW (file format), an enhanced compressed wavelet file format designed for geospatial imagery
 ECW model in chemistry for Lewis acid–Lewis base interactions
 ECW Press, a Canadian book publisher